Cotopaxi International Airport  is a high-elevation airport in Latacunga, the capital of the Cotopaxi Province in Ecuador. The airport is within a broad valley of the Ecuadoran Andes, with rising terrain east and west, and mountainous terrain distant in all quadrants.

It has the second longest runway in Ecuador. Runway length includes a  displaced threshold on Runway 19.

Airlines and destinations

Cargo

Cargo B airlines once operated to the airport with Boeing 747 freighter airplanes, making it the largest airplane to operate at this airport. Cargolux currently operates the type to Europe from Cotopaxi.

See also
Transport in Ecuador
List of airports in Ecuador

References

External links 
OurAirports - Latacunga
SkyVector - Latacunga

Airports in Ecuador
Buildings and structures in Cotopaxi Province